V346 Centauri is a variable star in the constellation Centaurus. An Algol-type eclipsing binary, its apparent magnitude has a maximum of 8.50, dropping to 8.77 during primary eclipse and to 8.72 during secondary eclipse, the latter being a total eclipse. From parallax measurements by the Gaia spacecraft, the system is located at a distance of about 2300 parsecs (7400 light-years), which is consistent with earlier estimates, based on its luminosity, of 2380 parsecs. The system is a confirmed member of the open cluster Stock 14, which contains many other young OB stars.

Both stars in the system are hot B-type stars, with spectral types of B0.5IV and B2V. The primary star shows signs of being evolved, while the secondary is still in the main sequence. Due to the eclipsing and double-lined nature of the system, the physical elements of the stars can be determined with high precision. The primary star has a mass of 12 times the solar mass, radius of 8.3 times the solar radius, and an effective temperature of about 27,000 K. The secondary star is smaller and cooler, with 8.5 times the solar mass, 4.1 times the solar radius, and temperature of 25,000 K. In visible light, the primary contributes about 84% of the system's luminosity, while the secondary contributes the rest (16%). There is no evidence in the spectrum or the light curve for a third star in the system.

The average separation between the stars is about 39 solar radii. The orbit of the system has a moderate eccentricity of 0.287 and is inclined by 84.4° in relation to the plane of the sky. It displays apsidal precession with a period of  years, which means that the argument of periapsis has a cyclical variation with this period. The times of minimum light of the system indicate that the orbital period changed suddenly around the year 1965, decreasing from 6.322123 to 6.321843 days (a decrease of 24 seconds). The reason for this is unknown.

References

Algol variables
Centaurus (constellation)
B-type subgiants
B-type main-sequence stars
Durchmusterung objects
101837
Centauri, V346